WTBK (105.7 FM), known as K-105.7, is a radio station broadcasting a country music format. Licensed to Manchester, Kentucky, United States. It features programming from ABC Radio, AP Radio and Premiere Radio Networks.

References

External links

TBK
Country radio stations in the United States